Charles Fausset Falls (1 January 1860 – 20 September 1936) was a unionist politician in Northern Ireland.

Falls studied on HMS Conway and then at Trinity College, Dublin, then managed the family estate, at Fallsbrook, County Tyrone.  During World War I, he served as a major in the Royal Inniskilling Fusiliers.

Falls stood unsuccessfully for the Ulster Unionist Party (UUP) in Fermanagh and Tyrone at the 1923 UK general election, being defeated by two Nationalist Party candidates. At the 1924 election, the Nationalist Party did not stand, and Falls was elected alongside fellow UUP member James Pringle, easily beating two Sinn Féin members. Falls did not stand in 1929, when two Nationalist Party members gained the constituency unopposed.

Personal life
Falls' eldest son was the historian Cyril Falls.

References

External links 
 

1860 births
1936 deaths
Alumni of Trinity College Dublin
Members of the Parliament of the United Kingdom for Fermanagh and Tyrone (1922–1950)
People from County Tyrone
Royal Inniskilling Fusiliers officers
UK MPs 1924–1929
Ulster Unionist Party members of the House of Commons of the United Kingdom
British Army personnel of World War I